Shyok Dam is located over the Shyok River in Ghanche District, Gilgit-Baltistan, Pakistan.

References

Dams in Pakistan
Hydroelectric power stations in Pakistan
Ghanche District
Dams in Gilgit-Baltistan